Nuria Niemes (born 19 June 1972) is an Ecuadorian former professional tennis player.

From 1992 to 2001 she featured in a record total of 31 Fed Cup ties for Ecuador. She is Ecuador's most successful doubles player with 16 wins and had a further two wins in singles. Towards the end of her playing career she also served as team captain.

ITF Circuit finals

Doubles: 7 (3–4)

References

External links
 
 
 

1972 births
Living people
Ecuadorian female tennis players
South American Games medalists in tennis
South American Games silver medalists for Ecuador
South American Games bronze medalists for Ecuador
Competitors at the 1994 South American Games
21st-century Ecuadorian women
20th-century Ecuadorian women